The 2013 FAI Cup Final was the final match of the 2013 FAI Cup, the national association football cup of the Republic of Ireland. The match took place on 3 November 2013 at the Aviva Stadium in Dublin. Drogheda United and Sligo Rovers contested the match.

The match was shown live on RTÉ Two and RTÉ Two HD in Ireland and was refereed by Paul Tuite, assisted by Damien MacGraith and Michelle O’Neill with Derek Tomney as Fourth Official. The Referee Observer was John Duffy.

Sligo Rovers won the cup for the third time in four years. Rovers substitute Danny North proved the difference between the sides with two goals in the last 15 minutes and assisted in a third for Anthony Elding to win it deep in injury time.

The match was preceded by the 2013 FAI Women's Cup Final, in which Raheny United defeated Castlebar Celtic after extra time.

Match

References

External links
Official Site

Final
FAI Cup finals
Fai Cup Final 2013
Fai Cup Final 2013
FAI Cup Final, 2013
FAI Cup Final